Sandra Bubendorfer-Licht (born 5 September 1969) is a German interpreter and politician of the Free Democratic Party (FDP) who has been serving as a member of the Bundestag from the state of Bavaria since 2019.

Political career 
Bubendorfer-Licht is chairwoman of the district association Mühldorf am Inn of the FDP Bavaria. She is an observer on the state executive committee of the FDP Bavaria. 

In the 2017 federal elections, Bubendorfer-Licht was a direct candidate in the Altötting constituency and ran for 13th place on the list for the FDP in Bavaria. On 9 December 2019 she moved up to the Bundestag to replace the late Jimmy Schulz. In parliament, she is a member of the Committee on Home Affairs and the Committee on Petitions. Since the 2021 elections, she has been serving as her parliamentary group’s spokesperson for religious communities.

References

External links 

 Bundestag biography 

 

1969 births
Living people
Members of the Bundestag for Bavaria
Female members of the Bundestag
People from Mühldorf (district)
21st-century German women politicians
Members of the Bundestag 2017–2021
Members of the Bundestag for the Free Democratic Party (Germany)
Members of the Bundestag 2021–2025